Miltochrista effasciata is a moth of the family Erebidae. It was described by Felder in 1861. It is found on Ambon Island in Indonesia.

References

effasciata
Moths described in 1861
Moths of Indonesia